Heimo Zobernig (born 1958) is an Austrian artist who works in a variety of media from painting and sculpture to site specific installation and design.

Education
Zobernig attended the Academy of Fine Arts (Akademie der bildenden Künste), Vienna in the late 1970s and graduated from the Academy of Applied Arts (Hochschule für angewandte Kunst), Vienna in 1983.

Academic career
Zobernig began his teaching career as a professor at the Academy of Applied Arts, Vienna. After several teaching fellowships in Germany he was appointed professor of art at the Academy of Fine Arts, Vienna, in 1999, where he continues to teach.

Work
Zobernig makes discreet objects—paintings and sculptures—that by necessity have an integral awareness of their context and history, not only in relation to fine art but also architecture and design. He also conceives and builds whole environments that encourage an all-encompassing awareness on the part of his viewers. What an artwork is, how it functions, and how viewers perceive and interact with it are fundamental propositions in Zobernig's work.

In "Untitled, LOVE HATE" for example, the use of Extra Bold Helvetica letters, as typical moderniste typeface, serves the appropriation/reinterpretation of Robert Indiana's painting (LOVE, 1966) taken up later on more politically by General Idea (AIDS, 1987) to create an paradoxal overlay between love and hate.

Exhibitions
Zobernig represented Austria in La Biennale di Venezia in 2015.

Awards
 Otto Mauer Prize, 1993
 City of Vienna Prize for Fine Art, 1997
 Frederich Kiesler Prize for Art and Architecture in Vienna, 2010
 Roswitha Haftmann Prize, 2016

Publications
Heimo Zobernig: Books & Posters Catalogue Raisonné, 1980–2015 (2017)

References

1958 births
Living people
21st-century Austrian artists
Austrian contemporary artists